The 5 arrondissements of the Charente-Maritime department are:
 Arrondissement of Jonzac, (subprefecture: Jonzac) with 129 communes.  The population of the arrondissement was 67,989 in 2016.  
 Arrondissement of Rochefort, (subprefecture: Rochefort) with 78 communes. The population of the arrondissement was 189,875 in 2013.  
 Arrondissement of La Rochelle, (prefecture of the Charente-Maritime department: La Rochelle) with 58 communes.  The population of the arrondissement was 215,707 in 2016.  
 Arrondissement of Saintes, (subprefecture: Saintes) with 88 communes.  The population of the arrondissement was 116,057 in 2016.  
 Arrondissement of Saint-Jean-d'Angély, (subprefecture: Saint-Jean-d'Angély) with 110 communes. The population of the arrondissement was 52,563 in 2016.

History

In 1800 the arrondissements of Saintes, Jonzac, Marennes, Rochefort, La Rochelle and Saint-Jean-d'Angély were established. La Rochelle replaced Saintes as prefecture in 1810. The arrondissements of Marennes and Saint-Jean-d'Angély were disbanded in 1926. The arrondissement of Saint-Jean-d'Angély was restored in 1943. 

The borders of the arrondissements of Charente-Maritime were modified in January 2017:
 two communes from the arrondissement of Rochefort to the arrondissement of La Rochelle
 one commune from the arrondissement of La Rochelle to the arrondissement of Rochefort
 17 communes from the arrondissement of Saintes to the arrondissement of Jonzac
 one commune from the arrondissement of Saintes to the arrondissement of Rochefort
 three communes from the arrondissement of Saint-Jean-d'Angély to the arrondissement of Rochefort

References

Charente-Maritime